The Northern York County School District is a midsized, suburban public school district in York County, Pennsylvania. It includes the Boroughs of Dillsburg, Franklintown, and Wellsville; as well as the Townships of Carroll, Franklin, Monaghan, Warrington, and Washington. The school district has a population of 20,023, according to a 2005 local census. By 2010, the district's population had increased to 21,108 people. The educational attainment levels for the Northern York County School District population (25 years old and over) were 91.9% high school graduates and 29.8% college graduates.

According to the Pennsylvania Budget and Policy Center, 20.6% of the district's pupils lived at 185% or below the Federal Poverty level as shown by their eligibility for the federal free or reduced price school meal programs in 2012. In 2009, the district residents' per capita income was $22,758, while the median family income was $55,258. In the Commonwealth, the median family income was $49,501 and the United States median family income was $49,445, in 2010. In York County, the median household income was $58,745. By 2013, the median household income in the United States rose to $52,100.

Special education was provided by the district and the Capital Area Intermediate Unit #15. Occupational training and adult education in various vocational and technical fields were provided by the district and the Cumberland-Perry Area Vocational-Technical School.

Northern York County School District operates: four K-5th elementary schools: (Dillsburg Elementary School, Northern Elementary School, South Mountain Elementary School, Wellsville Campus); Northern Middle School (6th–8th), and Northern High School (9th–12th). High school students may choose to attend Cumberland Perry Area Vocational Technical School for training in the construction and mechanical trades.

In 2012, the Washington Township Educational Coalition filed a petition with the Court of Common Pleas of York County, Pennsylvania, to initiate the process of transferring Washington Township from the Dover Area School District to the Northern York County School District. The petitioners cited the superior education outcomes and lower property taxes in Northern County School District as motives for the change request. Estimates project a net gain of $800,000 to $1 million over the next five years to Northern York County School District if the change were approved. After initially denying the petition in March 2017, the State Board of Education issued an order on March 10, 2021, transferring Washington Township to the Northern York County School District effective with the 2021-2022 school year.

Extracurriculars
Northern York County School District's students have access to a variety of clubs, activities and an extensive sports program. Eligibility for participation is determined by the school board policy, which includes criteria on school attendance and academic performance. The District is part of the Mid-Penn Conference for sports.

Sports
The district funds:

Boys:
Baseball – AAA
Basketball- AAAA
Cross Country – AAA
Football – AAA
Golf – AAA
Indoor Track and Field – AAAA
Lacrosse – AAAA
Soccer – AAA
Swimming and Diving – AAA
Tennis – AAA
Track and Field – AAA
Volleyball – AA
Wrestling – AAA

Girls:
Basketball – AA
Cheerleading – AAA
Cross Country – AA
Indoor Track and Field – AAAA
Field Hockey – AA
Golf – AAA
Lacrosse – AAAA
Soccer (Fall) – AA
Softball – AAA
Swimming and Diving – AAA
Girls' Tennis – AAA
Track and Field – AAA
Volleyball – AA

Middle School sports:

Boys:
Basketball
Cross Country
Football
Soccer
Track and Field
Wrestling	

Girls:
Basketball
Cross Country
Field Hockey
Soccer (Fall)
Track and Field
Volleyball

References

External links 
 

School districts in York County, Pennsylvania
York County, Pennsylvania